GVP may refer to:

Places
 Greenvale Airport, Australia, by IATA code

Organisations
 All-German People's Party, a political party in West Germany
 Goa Vikas Party, a political party in Goa, India
 Great Valley Products, a former third-party Amiga hardware supplier
 Gurukula Vidya Peeth, a high school in Andhra Pradesh, India
 Gwendoline van Putten School, a secondary school in St. Eustatius, Dutch Caribbean
 Golden Village Pictures, the distribution arm of cinema operator Golden Village

Other
 Global Volcanism Program, of the Smithsonian Institution
 Good pharmacovigilance practice as defined by the European Medicines Agency (EMA)
 Pará Gavião language, by ISO 639 code